Melentyevo is a rural locality (a village) in Krasnopolyanskoye Rural Settlement, Nikolsky District, Vologda Oblast, Russia. The population was 546 as of 2002. There are 20 streets.

Geography 
Melentyevo is located 2 km northwest of Nikolsk (the district's administrative centre) by road. Nikolsk is the nearest rural locality.

References 

Rural localities in Nikolsky District, Vologda Oblast